The Independencia Formation is a Dapingian geologic formation of western-central Bolivia. The dark to bluish gray schists and phyllites metamorphosed shales were deposited in an open marine environment.

Fossil content 
The formation has provided the following fossils:

 Didymograptellus protobifidus
 Phyllograptus anna
 Pseudophyllograptus angustifolius
 Notopeltis sp.
 Michelinoceras sp.

See also 
 List of fossiliferous stratigraphic units in Bolivia

References

Further reading 
 R. Suárez Soruco. 1976. El sistema ordovícico en Bolivia. Revista Tecnica YPF Bolivia 5(2):111-123

Geologic formations of Bolivia
Ordovician System of South America
Ordovician Bolivia
Dapingian
Shale formations
Open marine deposits
Ordovician southern paleotemperate deposits
Paleontology in Bolivia
Formations